Bettina Schaller is a Swiss labour market executive and president of the World Employment Confederation.

Early life 
Born in Basel, Switzerland, Schaller is the daughter of a diplomat who served across South America and Europe throughout her childhood. She completed a bachelor's degree in Political Science and European studies in Madrid, Spain, and a first master's degree in Freiburg im Brisgau, Germany, followed by a second Advanced Master at the Europa Institut in Basel.

Career 

Schaller has worked for the Swiss Federal Department of Foreign Affairs at The Mission of Switzerland to the European Union in Brussels and has held roles in the financial and sports Industry, as well as in the NGO sector. She works for the Adecco Group, where she heads the Group Public Affairs activities, dealing with regulatory and policy issues. She also handles the Adecco Group's engagement in Employers' Association at global and European scale, as well as international institutions.

She was the president of the World Employment Confederation's Europe chapter and in 2020 she was elected global president of the organisation. She has served as vice-chair of OECD BIAC ELSA Committee, as a member of the G20-B20 Future of Work and Education Task Force, a member of the B20 International Advocacy Caucus and a steering group member on the World Economic Forum Center for New Economy and Society and for the Global Apprenticeship Network.

Awards 
In 2017, 2018, 2019, 2020 and 2021 Schaller was recognized as a "Staffing 100 Europe Influencer" and was included in the International 50 of the "Global Power 100 – Women in Staffing".

References 

Businesspeople from Basel-Stadt
Year of birth missing (living people)
Living people
21st-century Swiss businesswomen
21st-century Swiss businesspeople
Swiss business executives